Nick Rosen may refer to:
 Nick Rosen (British filmmaker)
 Nick Rosen (American filmmaker)